Mithila 2 Solar PV Station is a 10 MW solar power plant located at Dhanusha District, Madesh Province; Nepal.  The plant is owned and under construction by Eco Global Power Development Pvt. Ltd., an IPP. The plant is planned to come in operation in February 2024.

The station occupies an area of about 35 Bighas of land (approx. 26.5 hector). The station has 28,504 solar panels, and three inverters to convert 690 DC to AC. The energy so generated by the project will be connected to the Dhalkebar Substation, which is about 1 Km from the plant. The generated electricity is planned to sell to Nepal Electricity Authority through PPA connecting to National Power Grid System.

See also
List of power stations in Nepal
Butwal Solar PV Project
Nuwakot Solar Power Station

References

Energy in Nepal
Renewable energy in Nepal
Solar power in Nepal
Solar power stations in Nepal
Electric power in Nepal
Buildings and structures in Dhanusha District